Virbia opella, the tawny holomelina, is a moth in the family Erebidae. It was described by Augustus Radcliffe Grote in 1863. It is found in the United States from Maine west to Illinois and south to Texas. The habitat consists of oak forests and scrub oak forests.

The length of the forewings is about 11 mm for males and 12 mm for females. The male forewings and hindwings are olive brown to dark drab with a sepia discal spot. The female forewings are cinnamon with a faint fuscous discal spot. The hindwings are peach red with tufts of faint cinnamon scales. There are multiple generations per year in most of the range. In Louisiana, there are three generations with adults on wing from November to February.

Larvae have been reared on dandelion species.

References

Moths described in 1863
opella